Bogdan Bojko  (born 10 February 1959 in Nowa Sól) is a Polish politician. He was elected to the Sejm on 25 September 2005, receiving 5,123 votes in 8 Zielona Góra district as a candidate on the Civic Platform list.

See also
Members of Polish Sejm 2005-2007

External links
Bogdan Bojko - parliamentary page - includes declarations of interest, voting record, and transcripts of speeches.

Members of the Polish Sejm 2005–2007
Civic Platform politicians
1959 births
Living people
People from Nowa Sól
Members of the Polish Sejm 2007–2011